Kakan may refer to:

Places
 Kakan (island)
 Kakan, Afghanistan
 Kakan, Iran
 Kakan Rural District, in Kohgiluyeh and Boyer-Ahmad Province, Iran

Other
 Genpuku, a Japanese ceremony
 Kakan (language), an extinct language spoken in northern Argentina and Chile